Wilki (Wolves) are a Polish alternative/pop rock band from Warsaw.

Wilki have written songs both in English and Polish. They are currently signed to Sony Music in Poland.

Discography

Studio albums

Live albums

Compilation albums

Band members 

Current:
 Robert Gawliński - lead vocal, guitars (1991 - 1995, 2001 - present)
 Mikis Cupas - guitars (1991 - 1995, 2001 - present)
 Maciej Gładysz - guitars (1991 - 1992, 2011 - present)
 Beniamin Gawliński - guitars, keyboards (2014 - present)
 Marcin Ciempiel - bass guitar (2002 - 2005, 2014 - present)
 Hubert Gasiul - drums (2006 - present)
 Emanuel Gawliński - bass guitar (2020 - present)
Former:
 Michał Rollinger - keyboards (1992)
 Adam Żwirski - bass guitar (1991; died in 1991)
 Marek Chrzanowski - bass guitar (1992 - 1995, 2001 - 2002)
 Andrzej Smolik - keyboards, piano, harmonica, accordion, organ, guitars, flute (1993 - 1995, 2001 - 2014)
 Leszek Biolik - bass guitar (2005 - 2011)
 Marcin Szyszko - drums (1992 - 1995, 2001 - 2006; died in 2013)
 Stanisław Wróbel - bass guitar (2011 - 2014)
 Dariusz Nowak - drums

References

External links
 

Polish alternative rock groups